Starting Over, also known by its working title Startin' Over, is a 2011 extended play by American singer La Toya Jackson. The EP contains two top twenty-five U.S. Billboard Dance Club hits; "Just Wanna Dance" and "Free the World". The autobiographical EP is described as the soundtrack to her memoir Starting Over.

Conception and recording 
Work on the album began in 2001 when Jackson was moved to write "Free the World" in the wake of the September 11 attacks. The song's positive reception spurred on Jackson to write more songs, ending up with a full album. The album's title is a reference to the six years Jackson spent out of the public's view in order to rebuild her life after divorcing manager Jack Gordon.

The original Startin' Over was completed in September 2002 and issued as a promotional copy the following year in order to secure a distribution deal. In 2006 the promo was leaked to the internet. The album's official release was beset with delays for years and in the interim Jackson recorded entirely new material that is expected to be released in the future.

Starting Over includes autobiographical tracks about Jackson's relationship with her abusive ex-husband and former manager Jack Gordon. Several of them hint towards brutal beatings and plans to have her family killed. The opening track, "Mafia Style" is a reference to Gordon's meetings with mobsters on New York's Mulberry Street. According to Jackson, "I was hearing a whole lot that I probably shouldn't have been hearing. I was the only girl, and they called me 'the kid', because these were older men and they would say, 'Is the kid going to talk?' and [Gordon] would always say, 'No, the kid doesn't talk,' because I would always say, 'I know nothing about nothing.'" 

The title track, "Starting Over", was recorded in 2006, but plans to release it as a single that year were scrapped. Instead, the song was reconstituted as a jingle for Australian beverage maker Star Ice. In early 2007, Ja-Tail released "I Don't Play That", based on Jackson's experiences on the CBS reality series Armed and Famous. In 2009, Jackson released "Home" as a charity single to benefit AIDS Project Los Angeles. "I Don't Play That" and "Home" are not included on the EP.

Release and promotion
Starting Over was digitally released on June 21, 2011 to online music retailers, to coincide with the same-titled book. The EP's title track was first previewed on Jackson's official YouTube channel at the end of May. A remix of "Starting Over" by Vibelicious was played during Jackson's Live and Uncensored Stickam event on July 31, 2011. She performed "Starting Over" on the September 4, 2011 episode of Mexican television series La Academia.

Track listing

References

La Toya Jackson albums
2011 debut EPs